Tiantai Temple is a Buddhist temple located in Gaocheng District of Shijiazhuang, Hebei, China.

History
The original temple dates back to the Zhenguan period of the Tang dynasty, while Tiantai master Zhang'an came to here to disseminate Lotus Sutra. The temple was gradually fell into ruin during the Chinese Civil War and was completely destroyed in 1985. Tiantai Temple was rebuilt in 1990, under the support of local Buddhist believers. In 2013, Guotong was proposed as the abbot of Tiantai Temple. He supervised the reconstruction project. The reconstruction took 12 years, and lasted from 2000 to 2012.

Architecture
The complex include the following halls: Shanmen, Mahavira Hall, Hall of Four Heavenly Kings, Hall of Ksitigarbha, Bell tower, Drum tower, Hall of Guru, Dharma Hall, Dining Room, etc.

References

External links
 

Buddhist temples in Hebei
Buildings and structures in Shijiazhuang
Tourist attractions in Shijiazhuang
21st-century establishments in China
21st-century Buddhist temples
Religious buildings and structures completed in 2012